The 2013–14 Tour de Ski was the eight edition of the Tour de Ski. The Stage World Cup event began in Oberhof, Germany on December 28, 2013, and ended in Val di Fiemme, Italy on January 5, 2014. The cups were defended by Justyna Kowalczyk (Poland) and Alexander Legkov (Russia).

Controversy
The "last minute changes" introduced by the organizers of 2013–14 edition of Tour de Ski resulted in controversies regarding the balance between the free and classical techniques in the competition. Some people, including the four times winner of Tour de Ski and Olympic Champion Justyna Kowalczyk, resigned from participation in protest against changes excessively favoring freestyle competitors.

Schedule

Final standings

Overall standings
Final Standings, with bonus seconds deducted.

Sprint standings
Final Sprint standings, all bonus seconds counts.

Stages

Stage 1
28 December 2013, Oberhof, Germany - prologue

Stage 2
29 December 2013, Oberhof, Germany

Stage 3
31 December 2013, Lenzerheide, Switzerland

Stage 4
1 January 2014, Lenzerheide, Switzerland

Stage 5
3 January 2014, Cortina d'Ampezzo-Toblach, Italy

Stage 6
4 January 2014, Val di Fiemme, Italy

Stage 7
5 January 2014, Val di Fiemme, Italy

The race for Fastest of the Day counts for 2013–14 FIS Cross-Country World Cup points.

References

External links

Tour de Ski
Tour de Ski by year
Tour de Ski
Tour de Ski
Tour de Ski
Tour de Ski
Tour de Ski
Tour de Ski
December 2013 sports events in Europe
January 2014 sports events in Europe